Walter Heise (28 August 1931 – 3 January 2017 was a German music educator and musicologist.

Life 
After his studies, he first worked as a teacher at primary schools and as an assistant and lecturer at various universities. From 1974 until his emeritus in 1998, Heise taught music education at Osnabrück University. In addition to comparative work on music education writings of the GDR, a special focus was his work on historical music education and John Gay's The Beggar's Opera and its adaptations, as well as the research focus "Music and New Technologies" in teacher training.

In 1986, Heise was awarded the Honorary Fellowship of the Curwen Institute in London.

Heise died in Belm at the age of 86.

Publications 
Heise published numerous papers on teaching practice as well as contributions to the history and systematics of music education in handbooks and journals. The musicologist is one of the co-founders and editors of the Zeitschrift für Musikpädagogik (ZfMP) and the Lexikon der Musikpädagogik (1972/1984). Heise is also editor of the Quellentexte für Musikpädagogik.

References

External links 
 

German music educators
German musicologists
Academic staff of Osnabrück University
1931 births
2017 deaths
People from North Rhine-Westphalia